Maurice John Colclough (2 September 1953 – 27 January 2006) was an  international rugby union player. He was selected for the 1980 British Lions tour to South Africa and the 1983 British Lions tour to New Zealand, playing in all four internationals each tour. He was a member of the England team that won the Grand Slam in 1980. At the time he played club rugby for Angoulême; he also played for Wasps RFC and Swansea RFC.

Early life
Maurice Colclough was born on 2 September 1953 in Oxford. He attended the Duke of York's Royal Military School and was its 1st XV Rugby captain in 1971, then England Schools Senior Shot Put champion in 1972. He is regarded as one of the most famous alumni of the school. He later attended the University of Liverpool and also went on to play for Liverpool St Helens.

Rugby union career
Having played for Liverpool RFC, Colclough went on to become one of the first Englishmen to play in France; he ended up captaining Angoulême, and also later played for Wasps RFC and Swansea RFC. He made his international debut on 4 March 1978 at Murrayfield in the Scotland vs England match, and his final match for England on 15 March 1986 at Parc des Princes in the France versus England match. Of the 33 matches he played for England, he was on the winning side on 17 occasions. Colclough was a member of the England team that won the Grand Slam in 1980. He was selected for the 1980 British Lions tour to South Africa and the 1983 British Lions tour to New Zealand, playing in all four internationals each tour. In 1983, he scored a try for England against New Zealand at Twickenham.

He also played for a World XV on 9 August 1980 against  in Buenos Aires, losing 36–22.

Later life
Colclough retired from rugby in 1986. After a long battle against a brain tumour, he died on 27 January 2006.

References
 The Independent Online obituary by Chris Hewett, 28 January 2006

1953 births
2006 deaths
Alumni of the University of Liverpool
British & Irish Lions rugby union players from England
England international rugby union players
English rugby union players
People educated at the Duke of York's Royal Military School
Rugby union locks
Rugby union players from Oxford
Swansea RFC players
Wasps RFC players
Liverpool St Helens F.C. players